Jean Jadot (23 November 1909 – 21 January 2009) was a Belgian prelate of the Roman Catholic Church. He served as apostolic delegate to the United States (the first non-Italian to do so) from 1973 to 1980, and President of the Secretariat for Non-Christians from 1980 to 1984.

Biography
Jean Jadot was born in Brussels. He was born to a well-known aristocratic family, and his father, Lambert, was a noted electrical engineer who worked around the world, including China and the Congo. In 1926, he entered the Catholic University of Leuven, from where he obtained his doctorate in philosophy magna cum laude in 1930. His thesis was on the work of Alfred Edward Taylor.

Jadot, despite his father's opposition, then entered the seminary of the Archdiocese of Mechelen, and was ordained to the priesthood by Jozef-Ernest Cardinal van Roey on 11 February 1934.

On 28 February 1968, Pope Paul VI appointed him titular archbishop of Zuri and apostolic delegate to Thailand, Laos, and the Malay peninsula (Malaysia and Singapore). He was consecrated a bishop by Cardinal Leo Joseph Suenens on 1 May 1968.

He was appointed Apostolic Pro-Nuncio to Thailand on 28 August 1969. On 15 May 1971, Jadot was appointed apostolic pro-nuncio to Gabon and Cameroon as well as apostolic delegate to Equatorial Guinea. On 23 May 1973 he was appointed the apostolic delegate to the United States.

Jadot was considered a progressive leader in the American Church and was at times polarizing in the statements he made and decisions he took. Jadot was seen favorably by the Vatican under Pope Paul VI, who rejected Jadot's initial offer to resign as apostolic delegate. 

On 27 June 1980, Pope John Paul II appointed him the Pro-President of the Secretariat of Non-Christians, a position normally held by a cardinal. Jadot's progressive views were the main obstacle to his being made a cardinal by Pope John Paul, who failed to include him when he created cardinals in February 1983. Pope John Paul accepted his resignation on 8 April 1984, a few months shy of his 75th birthday when he was required to submit his resignation.

Jadot died in Woluwe-Saint-Pierre, Belgium, on 21 January 2009.

References

Additional sources 
 John Alonzo Dick. Jean Jadot: Paul's Man in Washington. Leuven: Another Voice Publications, 2021.

External links
Catholic Hierarchy 

1909 births
2009 deaths
20th-century Roman Catholic bishops in the United States
Roman Catholic titular archbishops
Pontifical Council for Interreligious Dialogue
Apostolic Nuncios to the United States
Apostolic Nuncios to Thailand
Apostolic Nuncios to Laos
Apostolic Nuncios to Equatorial Guinea
Apostolic Nuncios to Gabon
Apostolic Nuncios to Cameroon
Permanent Observers of the Holy See to the Organization of American States
Belgian Roman Catholic titular bishops
Bishops appointed by Pope Paul VI